Scesa Point is a rounded, low ice-free tipped point on the west coast of Ioannes Paulus II Peninsula, western Livingston Island in the South Shetland Islands, Antarctica forming the north side of the entrance to Zornitsa Cove.

The feature is named after Benjamín Scesa, a crewman of the Argentine Navy Lockheed Neptune aircraft that crashed in poor weather on the slopes of Mount Friesland on 15 September 1976.

Location

Maps
 L.L. Ivanov et al. Antarctica: Livingston Island and Greenwich Island, South Shetland Islands. Scale 1:100000 topographic map. Sofia: Antarctic Place-names Commission of Bulgaria, 2005.
 L.L. Ivanov. Antarctica: Livingston Island and Greenwich, Robert, Snow and Smith Islands. Scale 1:120000 topographic map. Troyan: Manfred Wörner Foundation, 2009. 
 L. Ivanov. Antarctica: Livingston Island and Smith Island. Scale 1:100000 topographic map. Manfred Wörner Foundation, 2017.

References
 Cabo Scesa. SCAR Composite Antarctic Gazetteer

Headlands of Livingston Island